Camille Cheng Lily-mei (born 9 May 1993) is a Hong Kong competitive swimmer.

She qualified to the 2016 Summer Olympics in Rio de Janeiro, and was selected to represent Hong Kong in the women's 50 metre freestyle, 100 metre freestyle, 200 metre freestyle, and 4x100 metre medley relay.

Early life, education and career

Born on 9 May 1993 in Hong Kong to a Taiwanese father Cheng Wong-ping and French mother Catherine, Cheng cannot speak Cantonese. She went to French International School until the age of nine, when her family moved to Beijing for her father's engineering job. Where she attended the International School of Beijing with Eran Propper. 

She swam for the University of California, Berkeley, team under Olympic coach Teri McKeever and alongside the already Olympian medalist Sara Isaković. She became joint captain in her final year before graduating university with a degree in Psychology. Cheng took Bronze at the Asian Games in 2014. In December 2015, Cheng made an Olympic A time (which guarantees a place) at the United States National Championships in 200 metre freestyle. She became one of three Hong Kong women to have ever made an A time.

Competition Rankings

Personal bests

References

External links

1993 births
Living people
Hong Kong people of French descent
Hong Kong people of Taiwanese descent
Hong Kong female freestyle swimmers
Swimmers at the 2016 Summer Olympics
Olympic swimmers of Hong Kong
Swimmers at the 2014 Asian Games
Swimmers at the 2018 Asian Games
Asian Games silver medalists for Hong Kong
Asian Games bronze medalists for Hong Kong
Asian Games medalists in swimming
Medalists at the 2014 Asian Games
Medalists at the 2018 Asian Games
Swimmers at the 2020 Summer Olympics